The Mamaroneck River is a freshwater stream located in Southern Westchester County, New York. The name of the river comes from a local native American word meaning, "where the fresh water meets the salt water." The river flows into Long Island Sound.

The watershed of the Mamaroneck River is 17.4 square miles. It is dominated by suburban residential neighborhoods and commercial and retail tracts. High density residential development also is prevalent throughout the middle and lower portions of the watershed.

Detail
Originating 430 feet above sea level in a small wetlands area in Harrison, the river flows south along the eastern boundary of White Plains. It joins the 'East Branch' near the junction of Anderson Hill Road and Westchester Avenue. The Mamaroneck River flows another 2.5 miles to its confluence with the 'West Branch', where it forms the river's main stem. Human encroachment into the stream corridor and manipulation of the stream channel are byproducts of intense residential construction in and around the river's headwaters.

The main stem of the Mamaroneck River flows southeasterly, paralleling Westchester Avenue and the Hutchinson River Parkway. Below the parkway, the river flows south to its confluence with the West Branch of the Mamaroneck River at the Mamaroneck Reservoir. South of the reservoir, the river forms the municipal boundary between Mamaroneck Village and Harrison. At the New England Thruway, the Mamaroneck River flows southward through Mamaroneck Village, where it joins the Sheldrake River and finally emptying into Mamaroneck Harbor on Long Island Sound.

Tributaries
Two principal tributaries enter the Mamaroneck River, one from the east and one from the west. The East Branch of the Mamaroneck River is the furthest upstream tributary and originates in north Harrison near the intersection of Westchester Avenue and Anderson Hill Road. The West Branch originates just south of the Hutchinson River Parkway near Mamaroneck Avenue.

The East Branch of the Mamaroneck River is 3.3 miles long. The main stem is 1.9 miles long north of its confluence with the east branch. The east branch originates from a small pond in north Harrison at about 400 feet above sea level and then flows southeast 0.7 miles into Forest Lake. South of Forest Lake, it flows westerly to its confluence with the main stem.

The West Branch of the Mamaroneck River is the smallest of the Mamaroneck River's two primary tributaries, draining an area of 2.3 square miles just south and southeast of downtown White Plains. The west branch originates from a wetland and pond adjacent to Archbishop Stepinac High School on Mamaroneck Avenue and flows about 2.75 miles south and southwest through several stormwater management basins to its confluence with the main stem near the intersection of Mamaroneck Avenue and Hutchinson River Parkway.

See also
List of New York rivers

References

Mamaroneck, New York
Long Island Sound
Rivers of New York (state)
Rivers of Westchester County, New York